Sebastián Escofet (La Plata, 1968) is an Argentine film music composer and musician.

Biography
At the age of 5, after long listening sessions in his grandfather Luciano's study, he knew music was his calling. At the age of 12 he decided to buy his first electric guitar, inspired by a poster of Pappo that decorated a schoolmate's bedroom. Poor grades forced him to be a self-taught composer up until 18, when he managed to start studying with certain formality & uncertain success. Along the path of musical learning & experimentation he has collaborated with artists like Chango Spasiuk, Gustavo Cerati, Los Estelares, Fabiana Cantilo, Ulises Butron, Jorge Drexler, Los 7 Delfines, Philip Glass, Kronos Quartet, Ezequiel Borra & Mussa Phelps, to name a few.

He composed the soundtrack for over 15 movies which participated in the most important film festivals in the world. He collaborated with Gustavo Santaolalla in 21 Grams & Biutiful, films directed by Alejandro González Iñarritu. He's performed live at festivals like Sonar, Netmage, Barcelona Forum & Multiplicidade.  He travels the world with his guitar, he collects instruments from each of the places he visits & he counts the days remaining before he can return to the ski tracks.

Discography
2020 Crimenes de Familia (soundtrack)2020 Gralunar2019 Ambientalismo2019 El Universo en Miniatura Vol 12016 El Hilo Rojo (soundtrack)2009 Núcleos2009 Horizontal / Vertical (soundtrack) 2008 Lluvia (soundtrack) 2008 Cordero de Dios (soundtrack) 2008 Las Vidas Posibles (soundtrack) 2009 El ultimo verano de la boyita (soundtrack)2008 Siberiana2008 El tunel del Juego2006 Pura Sangre (soundtrack)2006 Diversión2005 Suite Patagónica2004 Próxima Salida (soundtrack)2004 Juego Divino2003 Ahora2000 Meditaciones

References

External links
Sebastian Escofet web

1968 births
Living people
People from La Plata
Argentine people of French descent
Argentine record producers
Argentine composers